The 1912 Washington & Jefferson Red and Black football team represented Washington & Jefferson College as an independent during the 1912 college football season. Led by first-year head Bob Folwell, Washington & Jefferson compiled a record of 8–3–1.

Schedule

References

Washington and Jefferson
Washington & Jefferson Presidents football seasons
Washington and Jefferson Red and Black football